Himerometra is a genus of crinoids belonging to the family Himerometridae.

Species
 Himerometra bartschi AH Clark, 1908
 Himerometra martensi Hartlaub, 1890
 Himerometra persica AH Clark, 1907
 Himerometra palmata ?
 Himerometra robustipinna Carpenter, 1881
 Himerometra sol AH Clark, 1912

References
 David J. Lane and Didier Vandenspiegel. 2003. A Guide to Sea Stars and Other Echinoderms of the World. Singapore Science Centre
 WoRMS

Himerometridae
Crinoid genera